The Bus is a bus simulation game developed by TML-Studios and published by Aerosoft. The early access version was available via Steam for Microsoft Windows on 25 March 2021.

Gameplay
The Bus is described as "the next generation of city bus driving simulation".  It is set in the capital city of Germany, Berlin, featuring a scale of 1:1 recreation of the city.

Development and release
The Bus is developed by TML-Studios, who is known for Fernbus Simulator, World of Subways series and City Bus Simulator series, with Aerosoft publishes the game. The early access version was available for Microsoft Windows on 25 March 2021. The game is set to leave early access in 2023, when multiplayer is expected to be available.

References

External links 

  

2021 video games
Bus simulation video games
Early access video games
Open-world video games
Single-player video games
TML-Studios games
Unreal Engine games
Video games developed in Germany
Video games set in Berlin
Windows-only games